Igor Aleksandrovich Kornet (Russian: И́горь Александрович Корнет) born April 29, 1973, in Voroshilovgrad, now Lugansk, is a Ukrainian militiaman, public official and separatist, since 2014 Minister of Interior of the Lugansk People's Republic.

Biography 
Igor Kornet was born on April 29, 1973 in the family of a career officer of the Soviet Army Alexander Kornet. In 1989 he graduated from school at the GSVG in Halle (GDR), after which he entered the Poltava Higher Anti-Aircraft Missile Command Red Banner School named after General of the Army Vatutin. In 1993 he entered the service of the Ministry of Internal Affairs of Ukraine. In 1999, he was dismissed from the post of a policeman of the patrol and guard service of the police of the Oktyabrsky district department of the GUMVD in the Luhansk region. Until 2014, he worked as a criminal investigation officer at the Ministry of Internal Affairs of Ukraine in the Luhansk region. During the hostilities in the Donbass, he fought on the side of the Luhansk People's Republic. Since August 27, 2014 he is the Minister of the Interior of the LPR. On November 20, 2017, he was removed from office by the head of the LPR, Igor Plotnitsky, but refused to leave his post, continuing to work as a minister, ignoring orders from the leadership of the LPR and arresting some of its representatives. After the resignation from the post of head of the LPR Igor Plotnitsky, Igor Kornet continued to work as the Minister of Internal Affairs of the LPR. He is wanted in the framework of criminal proceedings under Part 1 of Art. 109 of the Criminal Code of Ukraine (actions aimed at violent change or overthrow of the constitutional order or at the seizure of state power). Since March 2017, the Main Investigation Department of the Investigative Committee of the Russian Federation (GSU ICR) has been investigating the role of Cornet in the murder of Russian citizen Artyom Bulgakov in November 2016.

International sanctions 
Due to the support of Russian aggression and the violation of the territorial integrity of Ukraine during the Russian-Ukrainian war, it is under personal international sanctions from different countries. Since April 8, 2022, it has been under the sanctions of all countries of the European Union. Since May 27, 2022, it has been under British sanctions. Since June 20, 2017, it has been under the sanctions of the United States of America. Since March 15, 2019, it has been under Canadian sanctions. Since April 13, 2022, it has been under the sanctions of Switzerland. Since October 2, 2020, it has been under the sanctions of Australia. Since February 26, 2022, it has been under Japanese sanctions.

Awards 

 Order "For Valor" II degree (LPR);
 Medal "For Faith and Freedom" (LNR);
 Jubilee medal "70 years of Victory" (LNR);
 Medal "Battle for Lugansk 2014" (LPR);
 Medal "For the Defense of Lugansk" (RKRP).

Family 

 Natalia Kornet (Wife).
 Ksenia Kornet (Daughter).
 Kirill Kornet (Son).
 Marina Igorevna Kornet (Daughter from previous marriage).

References

External links
Living people
People from Luhansk
People of the Luhansk People's Republic
Pro-Russian people of the 2014 pro-Russian unrest in Ukraine
Pro-Russian people of the war in Donbas
Ukrainian defectors